CAF Utah Wing Museum is one of many local detachments of the national Commemorative Air Force (CAF) non-profit aviation association dedicated to Honoring American Military Aviation through Flight, Exhibit and Remembrance.

The Museum is located at Russ McDonald Field, Utah, and contains artifacts and exhibits from World War II, Korean, and Vietnam wars. In addition they operate a N2S Stearman aircraft and two T-6 Advanced Trainer aircraft - part of the CAF's fleet of over 170 vintage warbirds - with rides available to the public.  Exhibits and displays preserve stories of local characters that participated in aviation. 
The Museum is closed, except by special arrangement, from October 31 to May 1 each year.

Flying aircraft on display

N2S/PT-17 Stearman History
N1387V (s/n 75-8291), an N2S-5 Boeing-Stearman Model 75, was manufactured in 1943 at the Boeing plant in Wichita, Kansas. It was purchased by the U.S. Government to be operated as a trainer by the Navy at Corpus Christi, Texas.  After World War II it was sold as surplus and was modified with a larger 450 hp engine for use in crop dusting. It was sold again in the early 1980s and flown as a sport and recreational aircraft. While en route to California the aircraft crashed in the Oquirrh Mountains.  The Commemorative Air Force purchased the salvage rights.  After significant restoration work at Twin Falls, Idaho, N1387V flew again August 17, 1988. Since then it has been part of the Utah Wing and appears at local airshows and provides rides to the public.

In December, 2015 N1387V underwent a wing restoration with old fabric removed, minor repairs performed, and completed new fabric and paint. N1387V flew during the 2016 season.  In October 2016 an extensive restoration of the fuselage and empennage began and is still underway.

SNJ/T-6 "Texan"
Two TEXAN trainers are on display and available for rides. The Texan was the advanced training aircraft used for formation, gunnery and tactics training in WW II.

Character Exhibits

 Emmett "Cyclone" Davis: Fighter pilot stationed at Pearl Harbor during the Japanese attack; later commander of the 35th Fighter Squadron in the Pacific.
 Ike Isaacs: B-17 bomber pilot.
 Russ McDonald: Founder of the Heber City, Utah airport.
 Tom Vetter: Commercial pilot for Delta Air Lines.
 Burnis Watts: Waco CG-4 glider pilot that participated in the Invasion of Normandy, Holland Invasion and the Crossing of the Rhine.
 Jackson Wells: B-17 bomber pilot, 8th air force, 306th bomb group, 367th squadron flying missions over Germany.

See also
Related lists
List of aerospace museums

References

External links

Aerospace museums in Utah
Heber City, Utah
Military and war museums in Utah